Ricky Yang is an Indonesian professional pool player of Chinese ancestry. His nickname is "The Piranha".

On Sunday, June 5, 2009, Yang made history in the world of pool by completing his magical winning streak at the 2009 Philippine Open Pool Championship with a smashing 11–4 triumph over Jeffrey de Luna in the final at SM Megamall in Mandaluyong, Philippines. It is the first international WPA World Ranking Tour won by him. He also became the first Indonesian player to do that. In 2013 he won the gold medal for 9 Ball Pool at the SEA Games in Myanmar.

Titles
 2013 Southeast Asian Games Nine-ball Singles
 2011 Southeast Asian Games Nine-ball Singles
 2009 Philippine Open 10-Ball
 2007 Southeast Asian Games Nine-ball Singles

References

Living people
Year of birth missing (living people)
Indonesian pool players
Indonesian people of Chinese descent
Place of birth missing (living people)
Cue sports players at the 2010 Asian Games
Cue sports players at the 2006 Asian Games
Southeast Asian Games gold medalists for Singapore
Southeast Asian Games silver medalists for Singapore
Southeast Asian Games bronze medalists for Singapore
Southeast Asian Games medalists in cue sports
Competitors at the 2013 Southeast Asian Games
Asian Games competitors for Indonesia